Saints Peter and Paul's Church is a Catholic church located on Carey's Lane in Cork City, Ireland.

History
Peter and Paul's was built to replace Carey's Lane Chapel, a much smaller structure built in 1786.

Under the guidance of Archdeacon John Murphy, a design competition was run in the 1850s and won by E. W. Pugin, son of Augustus Pugin. The foundation stone was laid on 15 August 1859. Though the construction of the church was completed in on 29 June 1864, and the public were granted the opportunity to view the interior of the church at this time, the church was unable to open as the debts associated with its construction had not yet been paid off. Exactly two years after the church first welcomed members of the public to enter, it was dedicated for worship on 29 June 1866.

Between 1939 and 1962, the roof of the building was renewed, and the baptistry was repaired.

In the 1980s the building underwent major renovations.

Architecture

The church comprises a central nave with gable roof and two aisles. The walls are of red sandstone with limestone dressing. The aisles are at either side of the nave, which is covered with a gable roof. The ridge of the roof is decorated by ornamental ironwork, partly gilt, terminated at the western gable by an ornamental cross with foliated arms.

The grand altar is carved from 36 tons of Carrara marble. The pavements surrounding the altar, and the steps, are all of white Italian vein marble. The apse is decorated with blue and gold ceiling panels. The flooring of the church is in white and black marble.

The pulpit and confessionals were carved from Russian oak by craftsmen from Leuven and Cork.

References

Notes

Sources

External links

Official site
Image gallery

Buildings and structures in Cork (city)
Roman Catholic churches in Cork (city)
Roman Catholic churches completed in 1866
Roman Catholic Diocese of Cork and Ross
Gothic Revival church buildings in the Republic of Ireland
E. W. Pugin church buildings
19th-century Roman Catholic church buildings in Ireland
19th-century churches in the Republic of Ireland